Lucerne Australian latent virus (LALV) is a plant pathogenic virus of the family Secoviridae.

External links
ICTVdB—The Universal Virus Database: Lucerne Australian latent virus
Family Groups—The Baltimore Method

Nepoviruses
Viral plant pathogens and diseases